In mathematical finite group theory, the Dempwolff group is a finite group of order 319979520 = 215·32·5·7·31, that is the unique nonsplit extension  of  by its natural module of order .

These three  nonsplit extensions can be constructed as follows: 
The nonsplit extension  is a maximal subgroup of the Chevalley group .
The nonsplit extension  is a maximal subgroup of the sporadic Conway group Co3.
The nonsplit extension  is a maximal subgroup of the  Thompson sporadic group Th.

References

External links
Dempwolff group at the atlas of groups.

Finite groups